Interstate 64 (I-64) in the US state of Illinois is a major east–west Interstate Highway that runs through southern Illinois from the St. Louis metropolitan area east to the Indiana state line near Grayville, Illinois.

Route description

I-64 enters Illinois running concurrently with I–55 and U.S. Route 40 (US 40) over the Mississippi River on the Poplar Street Bridge. After splitting from these highways in East St. Louis, I-64 turns southeasterly and proceeds through St. Clair County towards the Belleville area traveling through the eastern/southeastern St. Louis suburbs of Caseyville, Fairview Heights, O'Fallon, and Shiloh. In Shiloh, the Interstate skirts the northern edge of Scott Air Force Base and MidAmerica St. Louis Airport and provides access to Mascoutah and Lebanon via Illinois Route 4 (IL 4). A new interchange at Rieder Road was completed in September 2017 to create better access to Scott Air Force Base.

At the St. Clair–Clinton county line, the Interstate passes the exurb of New Baden, after which it crosses the southern boundary of Clinton County and leaves the St. Louis metropolitan area. It then traverses a rural part of Illinois through Washington and Jefferson counties, which has no adjacent cities or major intersections passing; it reaches the city of Mount Vernon in Jefferson County, where it has a short concurrency with I-57. Mount Vernon is the only major city and intersection served by I-64 in Illinois outside of the St. Louis metropolitan area. Past Mount Vernon, the Interstate enters another rural stretch through parts of Jefferson, Wayne, and White counties before crossing the Wabash River into Indiana.

History
Starting in 1970, a small portion of I-64 opened just west of the Indiana state line. In 1973, another small portion opened just south of Mount Vernon. By 1975, two portions of I-64 (from IL 4 to I-57 and IL 111 to IL 159) opened. By 1977, the rest of the route opened. As a result of the completion, US 460 was completely removed from Illinois.

Exit list

References

External links

 Illinois
64
Transportation in St. Clair County, Illinois
Transportation in Clinton County, Illinois
Transportation in Washington County, Illinois
Transportation in Jefferson County, Illinois
Transportation in Wayne County, Illinois
Transportation in White County, Illinois